This list of shipwrecks in 1819 includes ships sunk, wrecked or otherwise lost during 1819.

January

1 January

2 January

3 January
For the wrecking of the British ship Andrew on this day, see the entry for 31 December 1818.

4 January

5 January

6 January

7 January

8 January

9 January

10 January

11 January

12 January

13 January

14 January

15 January

16 January

17 January

18 January

19 January

20 January

21 January

22 January

23 January

24 January

25 January

26 January

27 January

28 January

29 January

30 January

31 January

Unknown date

February

1 February

2 February

3 February

4 February

5 February

6 February

7 February

9 February

10 February

11 February

12 February

14 February

15 February

16 February

17 February

18 February

19 February

20 February

21 February

22 February

23 February

24 February

25 February

27 February

=28 February

Unknown date

March

1 March

2 March

3 March

4 March

5 March

7 March

9 March

11 March

13 March

14 March

15 March

17 March

18 March

19 March

20 March

21 March

22 March

23 March

24 March

25 March

26 March

27 March

28 March

29 March

31 March

Unknown date

April

1 April

2 April

3 April

6 April

7 April

9 April

10 April

12 April

15 April

18 April

19 April

21 April

22 April

23 April

24 April

25 April

26 April

27 April

28 April

30 April

Unknown date

May

3 May

5 May

7 May

9 May

10 May

13 May

14 May

15 May

16 May

21 May

22 May

23 May

24 May

25 May

27 May

28 May

29 May

31 May

Unknown date

June

1 June

2 June

6 June

8 June

9 June

10 June

13 June

14 June

15 June

17 June

19 June

20 June

21 June

24 June

25 June

29 June

Unknown date

July

6 July

7 July

13 July

14 July

16 July

17 July

18 July

19 July

20 July

21 July

22 July

24 July

25 July

27 July

30 July

Unknown date

August

1 August

2 August

5 August

6 August

9 August

13 August

14 August

15 August

17 August

18 August

23 August

25 August

26 August

27 August

29 August

30 August

31 August

Unknown date

September

1 September

2 September

3 September

5 September

6 September

7 September

8 September

9 September

14 September

15 September

16 September

17 September

18 September

20 September

21 September

22 September

24 September

25 September

26 September

27 September

28 September

30 September

Unknown date

October

2 October

3 October

5 October

6 October

7 October

9 October

10 October

12 October

13 October

14 October

15 October

16 October

17 October

18 October

19 October

20 October

21 October

22 October

23 October

24 October

25 October

26 October

27 October

28 October

29 October

30 October

31 October

Unknown date

November

2 November

3 November

4 November

5 November

6 November

7 November

8 November

9 November

10 November

11 November

12 November

13 November

14 November

15 November

16 November

17 November

18 November

19 November

20 November

21 November

22 November

23 November

24 November

25 November

26 November

27 November

28 November

29 November

30 November

Unknown date

December

1 December

2 December

3 December

4 December

5 December

6 December

7 December

8 December

9 December

10 December

12 December

13 December

14 December

15 December

16 December

17 December

18 December

19 December

20 December

21 December

22 December

24 December

25 December

26 December

27 December

28 December

29 December

30 December

31 December

Unknown date

Unknown date

References

1819